JAPAN DANCE DELIGHT is major street dance competition held annually since 1994 in Japan.

Past Champions

External links 
  DANCE DELIGHT WEB SITE

Street dance
Street dance competitions